"Nobody's Home" is third single released from Canadian singer-songwriter Avril Lavigne's second studio album, Under My Skin (2004). The track was written by Lavigne and former Evanescence guitarist Ben Moody, who also plays guitar on the song. "Nobody's Home", produced by Don Gilmore, is generally slower-paced than Lavigne's previous singles from Under My Skin.

The song was well-received critically and commercially, reaching number 41 on the US Billboard Hot 100 chart and peaking within the top 40 on the charts of Australia and nine European countries, including Austria, Greece, Ireland, and the United Kingdom. One of the song's B-sides, "I Always Get What I Want", was released as a single on iTunes on 31 October 2004.

Critic and fan response
Riff magazine described the song as having influences of post-grunge. In an AOL Radio listener's poll, "Nobody's Home" was voted Lavigne's seventh best song. PopMatters implied that because of song's title "should tell you that the dominate mood is one of anger and defensiveness."

Chart performance
"Nobody's Home" reached number 41 on the US Billboard Hot 100, spending 17 weeks on the chart. It peaked higher in the UK and Australia, reaching number 24 in both countries; it was her lowest-charting UK single before "Hot" charted in 2007 and peaked at number 30.

Music video

The music video was filmed on 29 and 30 July 2004 in Los Angeles, California, directed by Diane Martel. The video of "Nobody's Home" premiered on 20 October on MTV's Total Request Live.

In the music video for "Nobody's Home", Lavigne plays a homeless teenager who appears to live street-to-street with a friend. Lavigne, who said it was a fun video to make, wore a black wig and acid-wash jeans when playing the homeless teenager. The video shifts to a more glamorous Lavigne who wears a dress with long, curled hair, singing the song with an orchestra behind her.

"Nobody's Home" showed the outcast, homeless Lavigne trying to get off the streets. She also tries to call her mother, but hangs up. As the video progresses, a store manager kicks her out of his store, but the outcast girl ends up going back into the store and is shown washing herself in a convenience store bathroom. She also tries playing the guitar on the street to try to earn money. Towards the end of the video, the runaway is seen trying to get inside parked cars, eventually finding an unlocked one, during heavy rain.  At the end of the video, the girl, with dirty clothes and messy hair, is shown with a tear rolling down her cheek. She then turns around and walks away as the camera fades out.

During the video Avril was wearing the T-shirt with logo of Moscow. Russian word "Москва" was printed on Avril's T-shirt.

References in the video
At the beginning of the video, one can see "A+D", for Lavigne's then-boyfriend, now ex-husband, Deryck Whibley. Next, in the bathroom scene where Lavigne is using the hand dryer, "A+D" can be seen inside a heart that is written on the bathroom wall. The other outcast runaway is real-life friend Monique, who also appeared as one of the young women in the "My Happy Ending" video.

Track listings

Personnel
Personnel are adapted from the US promo CD liner notes and inlay.

 Avril Lavigne – words, music, vocals
 Ben Moody – music, guitar
 Jon O'Brien – keyboards, programming
 David Campbell – string arrangement
 Brooks Wackerman – drums
 Don Gilmore – production, recording
 Tom Lord-Alge – mixing

 Leon Zervos – mastering
 Joshua Sarubin – A&R
 Shauna Gold – management
 Terry McBride – management
 Kim Kinakin – artwork design
 James Minchin III – photography

Charts

Certifications

Release history

References

2004 singles
2004 songs
Avril Lavigne songs
Arista Records singles
Bertelsmann Music Group singles
Music videos directed by Diane Martel
RCA Records singles
Songs about homelessness
Songs written by Avril Lavigne
Songs written by Ben Moody

lt:Under My Skin#Nobody's Home